Mark Shepherd was an American fantasy novelist and musician.

Life and career 
Born Robert Marky Shepherd on September 21, 1961 in Tampa, Florida, during the 1990s Shepherd was a writing protégé and live-in personal secretary of author Mercedes Lackey and artist Larry Dixon at Highflight, their Tulsa, Oklahoma residence.

He co-authored two novels with Lackey, and composed music to accompany his later books. He also wrote several short stories.

Shepherd's secretarial duties at Highflight were taken over by Englishman Paul Fisher in 2000.

During his later years, Mark founded Pagan Sanctum Recovery, a 12-step group for Pagans recovering from addictions of all kinds.

Death 
He committed suicide by shooting himself on May 24, 2011.

Novels

Wheels of Fire
Shepherd's first published work was Wheels of Fire, a collaboration with Mercedes Lackey, and the 2nd novel in her SERRAted Edge series.

Intended to draw attention to the plight of abused children, Wheels of Fire focused on mother Cindy Chase's search for her son Jamie, who had been abducted by her estranged husband and kept prisoner by a religious cult. An epilogue to the story provided several hotline help numbers.

Wheels of Fire was later reprinted in the omnibus edition The Otherworld, which was made available in e-text format as part of Baen Books', on the disc included with initial hardcover printings of Mercedes Lackey and Roberta Gellis' This Sceptre'd Isle.

Alinor, protagonist of Wheels of Fire, briefly mentions an elf Grove located in Dallas, Texas, which is the primary setting for Shepherd's solo spin-offs.

Elvendude
Believing himself to be an ordinary teenager raised by a single mom, Adam McDaris discovers that his "mother" is in fact the local elf-king's daughter, who pledged to take her brother the Heir to safety, hiding him as a mortal to escape detection by the enemy who destroyed their home. The novel's plot involves an evil organization plotting world domination through the distribution of vials of magical crack cocaine.

Spiritride
The ghosts of human motorcycle riders get caught up in a war between the restored Elfhame Avalon and the drug-dealing Unseleighe Prince who plagues them.

Laserwarz
With her brother secure on his rightful throne, adventurous elven Lady Samantha returns to the "real" world as an FBI agent, investigating a series of mysterious disappearances at a laser arcade in Tulsa.

The Bard's Tale
Collaborating again with Mercedes Lackey, Shepherd wrote Prison of Souls, the third novel in The Bard's Tale computer game tie-in novelization series.

Shepherd later followed it up with a solo sequel, Escape from Roksamur, reprising the adventures of his character Alaire.

Blackrose Avenue
Blackrose Avenue is Shepherd's 2001 standalone novel, set in a dystopic future wherein rebels struggle to free the country from the grip of a fanatic religious regime which has taken over.  All those with HIV are put into concentration camps, according to the "Good Law."

Music
Mark Shepherd composed music inspired by his writing, including full soundtracks to Elvendude, Spiritride, and Laserwarz.

Spiritride was released on cassette tape by Firebird Music. Blackrose Avenue, the CD is available via Yard Dog Press, publisher of the novel it accompanies.

Appearances in other media
Mark Shepherd has a brief cameo in Mercedes Lackey's novel Jinx High, as a student attending a creative writing class.  He was also the inspiration for her character Vanyel Ashkevron from The Last Herald Mage trilogy.

Bibliography
Wheels of Fire (1992 ) (series: Serrated Edge vol 2) with Mercedes Lackey
Prison of Souls (1993 ) (series: The Bard's Tale vol. 3)
Elvendude (1994 ) (series: Serrated Edge)
Escape from Roksamur (1997 ) (series: The Bard's Tale)
Spiritride (1997 ) (series: Serrated Edge)
Lazerwarz (1999 ) (series: Serrated Edge)
Blackrose Avenue (2001)

References

External links
 Mark Shepherd — Baen Books Baen Books author page, with links to free sample chapters
 

 Mark Shepherd Fantastic Fiction author information for Mark Shepherd
 SPIRIT RIDE cassette Firebird Music catalogue page for Spiritride album
 Blackrose Avenue Yard Dog Press information page for Blackrose Avenue novel and CD soundtrack

American fantasy writers
American gay writers
2011 suicides
American male novelists
1961 births